Adamos is a given name and a surname. It may refer to:

Adamos Adamou (born 1950), Cypriot politician and Member of the European Parliament 
Adamos Andreou (born 1994), Cypriot footballer
Ian Adamos (born 1988), Guamanian international footballer

See also
Adamo, a name
Adamov (disambiguation)